Timothy Wallace House is a historic home located at Rochester in Monroe County, New York. It was constructed about 1840 for farmer Timothy Wallace and is a typical example of a regional farmhouse. It is an intact representative example of vernacular Greek Revival style architecture in Western New York. The original structure featured a two-story main block with flanking wings that was added to and modified throughout the 19th and 20th centuries.

It was listed on the National Register of Historic Places in 1994.

References

Houses in Rochester, New York
Houses on the National Register of Historic Places in New York (state)
Greek Revival houses in New York (state)
Houses completed in 1840
National Register of Historic Places in Rochester, New York